Bipectilus tindalei is a species of moth in the family Hepialidae, known to inhabit Vietnam and Thailand.

References

Moths described in 1988
Hepialidae